J. W. Harris may refer to the following:

James Harrison (Australian governor) (1912–1971), Australian politician
James Harris (solicitor) (1940–2004), British legal scholar
J.W. Harris (bull rider) (born 1986), American bull riding world champion